Concessions in China were a group of concessions that existed during the late Imperial China and the Republic of China, which were governed and occupied by foreign powers, and are frequently associated with colonialism and imperialism.

The concessions had extraterritoriality and were enclaves inside key cities that became treaty ports. All the concessions have been dissolved in the present day.

History

Imperial China period 
Imperial China granted the concessions during the latter period of the Qing dynasty, as a result of the series of "unequal treaties". They began in 1842's Treaty of Nanjing with the United Kingdom. Under each treaty, China was usually obligated to open more treaty ports for trade and lease out more territory as part of the concession or surrender it completely. The one exception that preceded this period was Macau, which had been leased in 1557 to the Kingdom of Portugal, during the Ming dynasty; Portugal continued to pay rent to China up to 1863 to stay in Macau.

There were a varying number of concessions in each city. For example, the foreign concessions in Tianjin reached a total of nine at the height of the era. The concessions were usually under the control of a single Western power or the Empire of Japan. However, in the Shanghai International Settlement, the United Kingdom and the United States merged their concessions, while the French retained their separate French Concession.

Operations 
In these concessions, the citizens of each foreign power were given the right to freely inhabit, trade, perform missionary evangelization, and travel. They developed their own sub-cultures, isolated and distinct from the intrinsic Chinese culture, and colonial administrations attempted to give their concessions "homeland" qualities. Churches, public houses, and various other western commercial institutions sprang up in the concessions. In the case of Japan, its own traditions and language naturally flourished. Some of these concessions eventually had a more advanced architecture of each originating culture than most cities back in the countries of the origin of the foreign powers. Over time, and without formal permission, Britain, France, Japan and the United States established their own postal systems within their concession and trade areas. Following Chinese complaints over the loss of postal revenue and the lack of customs inspections, all of them were abolished at the end of 1922.

Chinese were originally forbidden from most of the concessions, but to improve commercial activity and services, by the 1860s most concessions permitted Chinese, but treated them like second-class citizens as they were not citizens of the foreign state administering the concession. They eventually became the majority of the residents inside the concessions. Non-Chinese in the concessions were generally subject to consular law, and some of these laws applied to the Chinese residents.

The Shanghai International Settlement became a major place of refuge for European immigrants, notably from Slavic and Baltic regions, and American travelers and displaced persons.

Laws 
Each concession also had its own police force and different legal jurisdictions with their own separate laws. Thus, an activity might be legal in one concession but illegal in another. Many of the concessions also maintained their own military garrison and a standing army. Military and police forces of the Chinese government were sometimes present. Some police forces allowed Chinese, others did not.

Wars 
Several wars would lead to the creation of colonial concessions taken from Qing China. These included the First Opium War (1839–1842), Second Opium War (1856–1860), Sino-French War (1884–1885), First Sino-Japanese War (1894–1895), and Russian invasion of Manchuria (1900). The Eight Nation Alliance's suppression of the Boxer Rebellion (1899–1901) would lead to participants being rewarded with concessions taken from the Qing dynasty, in the years following the conflict. It also led the foreign powers to station barracks and troops in the existing concessions, especially Tianjin, and increased the immigration of entire families to the concessions.

Wars that changed the ownership of existing concessions between the foreign powers included the Triple Intervention (1895) and the Russo-Japanese War (1904–1905).

Republic of China period 

The foreign concessions continued to exist during the mainland period of the Republic of China.

The Asia and Pacific theatre of the First World War would be another major incident changing the ownership of concessions in China with Japanese expansion. Concessions were partially curtailed in the Washington Naval Treaty and the Nine Power Treaty attempting to reaffirm the sovereignty of China.

Many foreigners arrived in the cities aiming primarily to get rich. During the first phase of the Chinese Civil War in the 1920s, the concessions saw a sharp increase in immigration both from surrounding Chinese territory, and from the West and Japan. The population of Chinese residents eventually surpassed foreigners inside the concessions. With international travelers, culture took on an eclectic character of many influences—including both language and architecture. This effect was exemplified in the Shanghai International Settlement and the multi-concessions in Tianjin. Writings from the time period indicate that both the Prussians and Russians were seen as acting culturally British. The wealthy built opulent buildings with multiple European and Chinese inspirations. Some Chinese entrepreneurs became very wealthy and hired foreign designers and architects.

In major cities like Shanghai and Tianjin, due to the existence of numerous jurisdictions, criminals could commit a crime in one jurisdiction and then easily escape to another. This became a major problem during the Republican period, with the rise of the post–Imperial Warlord era and the collapse of central authority in the 1920s and the 1930s. Crime often flourished, especially organized crime by different warlord groups.

Some efforts were made by the foreign powers to have the different police forces cooperate and work together, but not with significant success. The image of gangsters and Triad societies connected with the major cities and concessions of the period is often due to extraterritoriality within the cities. Underdeveloped economies under a foreign government led many laborers without opportunities to be recruited by triads, who developed a subculture inspired by other eras that China was under foreign domination. Secret societies controlled drug trade, gambling, and prostitution in Shanghai. Western outlaws also created organized crime groups, in one instance creating an "orientalist mini crime empire" in 1930s Shanghai.

From the 1919 Karakhan Manifesto to 1927, diplomats of the Soviet Union would promise to revoke concessions in China, but the Soviets secretly kept tsarist concessions such as the Chinese Eastern Railway, as well as consulates, barracks, and Orthodox churches. This led Chiang Kai-Shek—who pushed foreign powers such as Britain to return some of their concessions from 1925 to 1927—to turn against his former Soviet ally in 1927, seizing Soviet legations. The Soviets would later fight an armed conflict to keep control over the Chinese Eastern Railway in 1929.

At the start of the Second Sino-Japanese War (1937–1945), the standing army in the Japanese concessions would be used against the Chinese forces. However the inland concession of Chongqing was abandoned by the Japanese as they began the invasion.

World War II would spell the end for the concessions in Tianjin, as well as extraterritoriality as a whole. While Japanese forces avoided attacking foreign concessions prior to the attack on Pearl Harbor, afterwards they invaded and occupied the Shanghai International Settlement and Hong Kong. Shanghai's status as a safe haven ended, as Jews who sought refuge in the city from 1933 to 1941, were forced into the Shanghai Ghetto in 1943, most survived the war due to the deeply established community with Chinese residents before 1941.

List of concessions 

Additionally, there were more concessions were planned but never completed.

See also 

 Unequal treaty
 List of Chinese treaty ports
 Century of humiliation
 Sick man of Asia
 Chinese Maritime Customs Service
 Tangier International Zone

Notes

References

Further reading 
Panikkar, K. M. (1953). Asia and Western dominance, 1498–1945, by K.M. Panikkar. London: G. Allen and Unwin.

External links 

 Treaty ports and extraterritoriality in 1920s China

 
China
China
Enclaves and exclaves
Former enclaves
Qing dynasty
Republic of China (1912–1949)
Foreign relations of the Republic of China (1912–1949)
19th century in China
20th century in China